Jacobus Johannes Venter (1814–1889) was a South African (Boer) statesman. He was a member of the Volksraad of the Orange Free State, chairman of the Joint Commission for Administering the Government in 1855 and served as Acting State President in 1859 – 1860 and again in 1863 – 1864.

Five towns in South Africa were named after the Venter clan: Ventersdorp, Venterstad, Venterspos, Ventersburg and Ventershoop.

References

 

Afrikaner people
South African people of Dutch descent
People from the Free State (province)
State Presidents of the Orange Free State
1814 births
1889 deaths
Members of the Volksraad of the Orange Free State